Fred van der Zwan (16 October 1935 – 12 July 2018) was a Dutch water polo player. He competed in the men's tournament at the 1960 Summer Olympics.

References

1935 births
2018 deaths
Dutch male water polo players
Olympic water polo players of the Netherlands
Water polo players at the 1960 Summer Olympics
People from Willemstad
20th-century Dutch people